Beer Hall Putsch is the ninth stand-up comedy album by Doug Stanhope. It was released on December 3, 2013, by New Wave Dynamics. It was recorded live at Dante's in Portland, Oregon. The DVD includes a bonus video podcast recorded on the night of the show. The album peaked at #1 on the US Billboard Comedy Albums chart.

Title
The album title is a sardonic reference to the Beer Hall Putsch, the failed 1923 Nazi coup attempt. On a podcast with Bill Burr, Stanhope explained the choice of title, saying:

Set listing

Chart history

References

External links
 Doug Stanhope's official website

2013 live albums
Doug Stanhope albums
2010s comedy albums
Stand-up comedy albums
2010s spoken word albums
Spoken word albums by American artists
Live spoken word albums